Nerl is an urban-type settlement (township) (since 1927) in Russia, Ivanovo Oblast, Teykovsky District, the administrative center of Nerlian urban settlement. Population:

Geography 
Nerl is situated in 62 km to the south-west from Ivanovo. It has a railway station on the line Ivanovo – Aleksandrov. The village of Kibergino is within the settlement.

Economics 
The main factory of the settlement is a weaving factory, also some wood-working factories are situated here.

Culture 
There is a culture house in the settlement.

People are related to the settlement 
Tatyana Yakovleva – the congresswoman of the state Duma of the Russian Federation.

References 

 
Urban-type settlements in Ivanovo Oblast